The men's T35 100 metres competition of the athletics events at the 2015 Parapan American Games was held on August 10 at the CIBC Athletics Stadium. The defending Parapan American Games champion was Hernan Barreto of Argentina.

Records
Prior to this competition, the existing world and Americas records were as follows:

Records Broken

Schedule
All times are Central Standard Time (UTC-6).

Results
All times are shown in seconds.

Final
Wind 0.0 m/s

References

Athletics at the 2015 Parapan American Games